Lists of military aircraft of the United States cover current and former aircraft of the United States Armed Forces.

By designation 
 List of United States Air Force aircraft designations (1919–1962)
 List of United States Navy aircraft designations (pre-1962)
 List of United States Army aircraft designations (1956–1962)
 List of United States Tri-Service aircraft designations
 List of U.S. DoD aircraft designations
 List of undesignated military aircraft of the United States

Other lists 
 List of U.S. DoD aircraft designations
 List of United States bomber aircraft
 List of United States military helicopters
 List of active United States Air Force aircraft
 List of active United States military aircraft
 List of active United States naval aircraft
 List of aircraft of the United States during World War II
 List of future military aircraft of the United States
 UAVs in the U.S. military

External links
 OrBat United States of America – MilAvia Press.com: Military Aviation Publications
 U.S. Military Aircraft and Weapon Designations
 Designation-Systems.Net
 Joe Baugher Homepage
 Main Aircraft Page
 National Museum of the USAF – Home
 Brown-Shoe Navy:  U.S. Naval Aviation
 Uncommon Aircraft

United States, List of military aircraft of
Aircraft

it:Designazione degli aerei USA